Rajon may refer to:

Districts of Belarus (singular: rajon)
Districts of Latvia (singular: rajons)

People
Rajon Das (born 1978), Bangladeshi architect
Rajon Rondo (born 1986), American basketball player
Claude Rajon (1866-1932), French politician
Paul Adolphe Rajon (1843–1888), French painter and printmaker

Others
Rajon Music Group, one of the largest independent record labels in Australia

See also
Rajan (disambiguation)
Raion, an administrative unit of several post-Soviet countries